Central is a Liverpool City Council ward in the Liverpool Riverside Parliamentary constituency. The population at the 2011 census was 20,340. It was formed for the 2004 municipal elections from the former Abercromby, Everton and Smithdown wards. It contains the majority of the city centre but also includes Kensington Fields in Kensington to the east and the Marybone/Holy Cross community in Vauxhall. The ward includes the longstanding city centre community around the Bullring, as well as many new city centre apartments.
Furthermore, the ward contains the Pier Head and the two larger universities; the University of Liverpool and Liverpool John Moores University.

In 2004 Central was the city's most marginal ward, largely due to the intervention of the hard left Liverpool Labour Community Party.  In more recent elections has become safer for Labour. The May 2008 local elections saw Labour take 62% of the vote.

The 2011 vote was effected by the controversy involving the Liberal Democrat candidate, Daniel Bradley the son of former Liverpool City Council Leader Warren Bradley, when Daniel disclosed that he had not signed the candidate paper, which his father had witnessed.

Councillors

 indicates seat up for re-election after boundary changes.

 indicates seat up for re-election.

 indicates change in affiliation.

 indicates seat up for re-election after casual vacancy.

Election results

Elections of the 2020s

Elections of the 2010s

Elections of the 2000s 

After the boundary change of 2004 the whole of Liverpool City Council faced election. Three Councillors were returned at this election.

• italics denotes the sitting Councillor
• bold denotes the winning candidate

References

External links
WARD PROFILE Central
LiverPages - Business, Charity and Trades Directory in Liverpool

Wards of Liverpool